Kanchala is a village of Kolar district in the southern Indian state of Karnataka. It is located about 50 km east of the state capital, Bangalore, just north of the Tamil Nadu border. In 2001, its population was 464 inhabitants, with 98 households, 233 males and 231 females.

In Kanchala village, agriculture is the main occupation. Finger millet (ragi) and vegetables are extensively grown here. Ragi mudde, also colloquially simply referred to as either 'Mudde' or 'HiTTu'; is a wholesome meal in Kanchala. It is mainly popular with the rural folk of Karnataka.

Kanchala has 3 main temple.  one is mariyamman temple, know for URU DEVARU. another one is Gopalaswamy temple, it is just near to mariyamma temple, mainly know for Srikrishna temple and another one is gangamma temple, And few are small temple like Ganesh temple, kadumalleshwara temple, muneshwara temples. AndThe main temple shanimahathma which is quite famous. 

Kanchala has school there almost 40 to 50 students passes out from 5th standard which is located near to the bus stop.

kanchala has also know for people who are interested in the jalikattu bull festivals, here few of the people are still grow their own bulls and prepare for jalikattu festival.

Masti Venkatesha Iyengar, a well-known writer in Kannada language and the fourth among Kannada writers to be honored with the Jnanpith Award, the highest literary honor conferred in India, was born at Hosahalli.

References 

Villages in Kolar district